Coast Guard Base Gloucester is the correct title for the former U.S. Coast Guard COTP Gloucester City, NJ (COTP standing for "Captain of the Port") as well as the now decommissioned U.S. Coast Guard Base Gloucester City, NJ.

The base was formed in 1898 and was closed in 1988, when the Coast Guard moved across the Delaware to Penn's Landing.
The base had two tug boats, one being the Coast Guard Cutter Cleat, the other the Coast Guard Cutter Catenary; one 41 foot UTB; one Oil Skimmer; and a 45 foot buoy tender. The site also had the main building that housed Administration, berthing for some of the crew, the galley, officers quarters, and the PX. There was a boat house, fire house, Aids To Navigation unit, and a stand alone crane for the small boats and buoys.
All of the above was housed on 10 acres of land and piers.

The base also had one buoy tender, the 157-foot Red Oak (WLM-689). The ship was commissioned on 17 December 1971 and was assigned to Gloucester City, New Jersey, and was placed under the operational control of the Third (later the Fifth) Coast Guard District.

References

1898 establishments in New Jersey
1988 disestablishments in New Jersey
Coast guard history